Matakohe is a settlement in Northland, New Zealand. The Matakohe River is a short river which runs from the north into the Arapaoa River, which is part of the Kaipara Harbour. State Highway 12 passes through Matakohe. Ruawai is 16 km to the west, and Paparoa is 6 km north east. The Hukatere Peninsula extends south into the Kaipara Harbour.

The Kauri Museum at Matakohe shows the area's heritage in the kauri timber industry.

History

European settlement

The Matakohe block was first settled by Pākehā in 1863, when members of the Albertland religious group arrived in New Zealand. The land was initially burnt off to allow for the planting of crops and grass. A weekly (initially monthly) ferry service brought mail, and a road was constructed to Paparoa. In 1881, the longest wharf in the Kaipara— long—was built at Matakohe to accommodate the steamers. Minnie Casey served Matakohe in the 1880s, and the S.S. Ethel, then the S.S. Tangihua in the 1890s.

The kauri gum industry became established around Matakohe in 1867-70, possibly the first place in the Kaipara District that the industry developed amongst settlers. A flax mill was built in 1870, but it was not profitable and was soon converted to a timber mill. This was replaced by a larger timber mill in the 1880s. The mill was destroyed by fire in 1906. Matakohe held a race-day each February, in which were entries from as far as Kaiwaka and Waipu.

In the 1890s, the population of Matakohe increased from 93 to 231, and the town was described as "the principal place in the Otamatea County". By 1902 the town had two boarding houses, a library, stores and a goods shed, as well as the older church and school. The population reached 264 in 1906, but declined to 141 in 1921.

20th century

The town's focus shifted from gum digging to dairy farming in the early 20th century. Apple growing was also successful at first, but ceased by 1935 due to the Great Depression and poor management. The roads improved, and by 1920 all  of roads in the area were metalled, using the abundant local supplies of limestone. The route to Dargaville was improved by the opening of a road through Ruawai in 1927, replacing the inland road.

Marae

Matakohe has two marae. Te Kōwhai Marae are affiliated with Ngāti Whātua and Te Uri o Hau. Matatina Marae and Tuohu meeting house are a traditional meeting place of Te Roroa.

Demographics
The SA1 area is part of the larger Ruawai-Matakohe statistical area.

Matakohe had a population of 120 at the 2018 New Zealand census, a decrease of 21 people (−14.9%) since the 2013 census, and unchanged since the 2006 census. There were 57 households, comprising 63 males and 60 females, giving a sex ratio of 1.05 males per female. The median age was 57.4 years (compared with 37.4 years nationally), with 15 people (12.5%) aged under 15 years, 12 (10.0%) aged 15 to 29, 54 (45.0%) aged 30 to 64, and 39 (32.5%) aged 65 or older.

Ethnicities were 92.5% European/Pākehā, 12.5% Māori, 0.0% Pacific peoples, 2.5% Asian, and 5.0% other ethnicities. People may identify with more than one ethnicity.

Although some people chose not to answer the census's question about religious affiliation, 50.0% had no religion, 30.0% were Christian, 5.0% had Māori religious beliefs, 2.5% were Buddhist and 5.0% had other religions.

Of those at least 15 years old, 15 (14.3%) people had a bachelor's or higher degree, and 30 (28.6%) people had no formal qualifications. The median income was $27,200, compared with $31,800 nationally. 15 people (14.3%) earned over $70,000 compared to 17.2% nationally. The employment status of those at least 15 was that 45 (42.9%) people were employed full-time, 18 (17.1%) were part-time, and 3 (2.9%) were unemployed.

Education

Matakohe School is a coeducational full primary (years 1-8) school with a roll of  students as of  The school celebrated its 125th reunion in 2003. When it was founded, the school shared a half day with Omaru School. Over the years, it has amalgamated with Ararua, Hukatere, Oparakau and Parahi schools.

There was a Matakohe School established in 1870. It used a church ante-room at first, then moved to the main church building while the school building was being constructed.

Notable people

 Gordon Coates, Prime Minister 1925-28, born on the Hukatere Peninsula at Ruatuna, and attended Matakohe School.

Notes

External links
Kauri Coast Information Centre website
The Kauri Museum

Kaipara District
Populated places in the Northland Region
Populated places around the Kaipara Harbour